"Seventeen" is the third single released from Blue band-member Simon Webbe's second solo album, Grace. The track was only released in Germany where it peaked at number 100.

Track listing
 CD Single
 "Seventeen" - 3:22		
 "Coming Around Again"  (Live from Cannes)  - 4:05
 "No Worries"  (Lovestar Remix)  - 4:15
 "Lay Your Hands"  (StarGate Remix)  - 4:11

Charts

References

2007 singles
Simon Webbe songs
2006 songs
Songs written by Tim Woodcock
Songs written by Matt Prime
Songs written by Simon Webbe
Innocent Records singles